Romania elects on a national level a head of state – the president – and a legislature. The president is elected for a five-year term by the people (after a change from four-year terms after the 2004 election). The Romanian Parliament has two chambers. The Chamber of Deputies has currently 330 members (after the last legislative elections), elected for a four-year term by party-list proportional representation on closed lists. The Senate has currently 136 members (after the last legislative elections), elected for a four-year term by party-list proportional representation on closed lists.

Romania has a multi-party system, with numerous parties in which no one party often has a chance of gaining power alone, and parties must work with each other to form coalition governments.

On 25 November 2007, for the first time, Romanians elected their representatives to the European Parliament.

Electoral system

President 
The President is elected in a two-round system for a five-year term. Candidates obtaining a majority of 50%+1 of all registered voters in the first round are declared the winner. If none of the candidates achieve this, then a run-off is held between the two contenders with the top scores in the first round. The candidate who obtains any majority of votes in the run-off is declared the winner.

The term of the president is five years. Between 1992 and 2004 the term was of four years, but was increased following the 2003 Constitutional referendum. One person can serve a maximum of two terms, that may be consecutive.

In order to be able to run for the Office of President a candidate must fulfill the following conditions: be a Romanian citizen, be at least 35 years of age (at least on the day of the election), and not have held the office for two terms since 1992, when the 1991 Constitution took effect.

Parliament 

The Chamber of Deputies and the Senate are elected in constituencies, by universal, equal, direct, secret, and freely expressed suffrage, on the basis of a list system and independent candidatures, according to the principle of closed party list proportional representation. The option for an identical election system of the two Chambers of Parliament confers them the same legitimacy, as both of them are the expression of the will of the same electoral body.

The two Chambers have different numbers of members: the Chamber of Deputies is composed of 330 Deputies, and the Senate of 136 Senators. This differentiation is possible owing to the legal provision of a representation norm differing from one Chamber to the other and due to the seats allotted to the national minorities (a seat in the Chamber of Deputies for each minority) and to the Romanians living abroad (4 seats in the Chamber and 2 in the Senate). Thus, for the election of the Chamber of Deputies the representation norm is of one Deputy to 73,000 inhabitants, and for the election of the Senate, of one Senator to 168,000 inhabitants.

The number of Deputies and Senators to be elected in each constituency is determined on the basis of the representation norm, by relating the number of inhabitants in each constituency to the representation norm. There are 43 constituencies: 1 for each county and the Municipality of Bucharest, and 1 for the Romanians living abroad. In a constituency, the number of Deputies cannot be less than four, and that of Senators, less than two. The number of inhabitants taken into account is that existing on 1 January of the previous year, published in the Statistical Yearbook of Romania. If, at least five months before the election date, a general census has taken place, the number of inhabitants taken into account is that resulting from the census.

The electoral threshold is for parties or candidates running individually 5% on national level or 20% in at least 4 constituencies, and 8-10% for coalitions or electoral alliances.

The Constitution of Romania and the Election Law grant to legally constituted organizations of citizens belonging to national minorities, in case these could not obtain at the election at least one Deputy or Senator mandate, the right to a Deputy mandate, if they have obtained throughout the country a number of votes equal to at least 5% out of the average number of votes validly expressed throughout the country for the election of one Deputy.

The mandates assigned, under the conditions of the Election Law, to organizations of citizens belonging to national minorities are added to the Deputy mandates resulted from the representation norm.

European Parliament 
To elect the 33 MEPs (35 MEPs between 2007 and 2009, 32 between 2014 and 2019), Romania is considered a single constituency. The system used is closed party list proportional representation, with a 5% threshold of the votes.

Local elections 
To elect the mayors the first past the post is used. The candidate who wins most of the votes is declared elected.

For the office of Presidents of the County Councils, between 2008 and 2012, the first pass the post system was used. Until 2008 and again since 2016, the County Council Presidents have been indirectly elected by each County Council.

To elect the Local and County Councils, the closed party list proportional representation, with a 5% threshold of the votes at the constituency level (city, commune or county).

Voting procedures 

Irrespective of the type of election, the vote is done by using paper and manual counting. The voter is required to prove his/hers identity using the Identity card (or the previous version, the Identity bulletin), or, for special reasons, the military ID or the passport. After (s)he signs in the permanent, supplemental, or special electoral list, (s)he is handed a voting ballot (buletin de vot) and a stamp that reads VOTAT YYYY TTT (voted); YYYY stands for the year the election is held, and TTT for the type of elections to be held: L for local elections (including partial), P presidential elections, PE for European Parliament election, R for referendums (R.V.U. was used in 2007). For the general election, up to now, there was no additional type indicator, as it is granted most importance.

For the local and parliamentary elections, the voter can vote only at the polling station where (s)he has the permanent address (domiciliu), or the temporary residence (flotant) at least three months old. For the local election, the Romanians outside Romania cannot vote. For the parliamentary election they vote the candidates for the 43rd constituency. For the European Parliament and presidential elections the voters can vote at a different pooling station than the local and parliamentary elections, but only if (s)he is not in the home-town the voting day. At the next legislative election the Romanian electors residing abroad will be able to cast their vote via mail.

The voting ballot is printed on newspaper paper, monochrome. All the candidates (or the full candidate list) are listed in a lottery type established order (first the parliamentary parties, than the non-parliamentary parties, and at the end, the independent candidates), each in a clearly designated rectangular that consists of the full party name, the candidate (or full list) and the party logo. Voters express their choice by stamping the rectangle of the party or independent candidate (s)he wishes to vote for. For referendums the same voting procedure is used. Each of the two options (YES – DA and NO – NU) are in a 5×5 cm square, YES on top and NO at the bottom, and the question voted for in the middle of the voting ballot.

Future elections

Election schedule

Latest elections

Presidential

European Parliament 

|-
|- style="background-color:#C9C9C9"
!style="background-color:#E9E9E9;text-align:center;" colspan="4" | Party
!style="background-color:#E9E9E9;text-align:center;" rowspan="2" | No. ofCandidates
!style="background-color:#E9E9E9;text-align:center;" rowspan="2" | Votes
!style="background-color:#E9E9E9;text-align:center;" rowspan="2" | Elected
!style="background-color:#E9E9E9;text-align:center;" rowspan="2" | Changein seats
!style="background-color:#E9E9E9;text-align:center;" rowspan="2" | % of seats
!style="background-color:#E9E9E9;text-align:center;" rowspan="2" | % of votes
|-
!style="background-color:#E9E9E9;text-align:center;" colspan="2" | National Party
!style="background-color:#E9E9E9;text-align:center;" | EU Party
!style="background-color:#E9E9E9;text-align:center;" | EP Group
|-
| 
| style="text-align:left;" |
| style="text-align:left;" | EPP
| style="text-align:left;" | EPP Group
| style="text-align:right;" | 43
| style="text-align:right;" | 2,449,068
| style="text-align:right;" | 10
| style="text-align:right;" | 
| style="text-align:right;" | 30.30%
| style="text-align:right;" | 27.00%
|-
| 
| style="text-align:left;" | Social Democratic Party()
| style="text-align:left;" | PES
| style="text-align:left;" | S&D
| style="text-align:right;" | 43
| style="text-align:right;" | 2,040,765
| style="text-align:right;" | 9
| style="text-align:right;" | 
| style="text-align:right;" | 27.27%
| style="text-align:right;" | 22.50%
|-
| 
| style="text-align:left;" | 2020 USR-PLUS Alliance()
 Save Romania Union()
 Freedom, Unity and Solidarity Party()
| style="text-align:left;" | —
| style="text-align:left;" | ALDE&R
| style="text-align:right;" | 40
| style="text-align:right;" | 2,028,236
| style="text-align:right;" | 8
| style="text-align:right;" |  8
| style="text-align:right;" | 24.24%
| style="text-align:right;" | 22.36%
|-
| style="background-color:"|
| style="text-align:left;" | PRO Romania()
| style="text-align:left;" | EDP
| style="text-align:left;" | S&D
ECR
| style="text-align:right;" | 43
| style="text-align:right;" | 583,916
| style="text-align:right;" | 2
| style="text-align:right;" |  0
| style="text-align:right;" | 6.06%
| style="text-align:right;" | 6.44%
|-
| style="background-color:#90EE90;" |
| style="text-align:left;" | People's Movement Party()
| style="text-align:left;" | —
| style="text-align:left;" | EPP Group
| style="text-align:right;" | 43
| style="text-align:right;" | 522,104
| style="text-align:right;" | 2
| style="text-align:right;" |  2
| style="text-align:right;" | 6.06%
| style="text-align:right;" | 5.76%
|-
| 
| style="text-align:left;" | Democratic Alliance of Hungarians in Romania()
| style="text-align:left;" | EPP
| style="text-align:left;" | EPP Group
| style="text-align:right;" | 43
| style="text-align:right;" | 476,777
| style="text-align:right;" | 2
| style="text-align:right;" |  0
| style="text-align:right;" | 6.06%
| style="text-align:right;" | 5.26%
|-
| 
| style="text-align:left;" | Alliance of Liberals and Democrats()
| style="text-align:left;" | ALDE
| style="text-align:left;" | —
| style="text-align:right;" | 43
| style="text-align:right;" | 372,760
| style="text-align:right;" | 0
| style="text-align:right;" |  2
| style="text-align:right;" | 0%
| style="text-align:right;" | 4.11%
|-
| style="background-color:#DDDDDD;" |
| style="text-align:left;" | Independent candidate: Peter Costea
| style="text-align:left;" | —
| style="text-align:left;" | —
| style="text-align:right;" | 1
| style="text-align:right;" | 131,021
| style="text-align:right;" | 0
| style="text-align:right;" |  0
| style="text-align:right;" | 0%
| style="text-align:right;" | 1.44%
|-
| style="background-color:#DDDDDD;" |
| style="text-align:left;" | Independent candidate: George-Nicolae Simion
| style="text-align:left;" | —
| style="text-align:left;" | —
| style="text-align:right;" | 1
| style="text-align:right;" | 117,141
| style="text-align:right;" | 0
| style="text-align:right;" |  0
| style="text-align:right;" | 0%
| style="text-align:right;" | 1.29%
|-
| style="background-color:#DDDDDD;" |
| style="text-align:left;" | Independent candidate: Gregoriana Carmen Tudoran
| style="text-align:left;" | —
| style="text-align:left;" | —
| style="text-align:right;" | 1
| style="text-align:right;" | 100,669
| style="text-align:right;" | 0
| style="text-align:right;" |  0
| style="text-align:right;" | 0%
| style="text-align:right;" | 1.11%
|-
| style="background-color:#D90000"|
| style="text-align:left;" | National Union for the Progress of Romania()
| style="text-align:left;" | —
| style="text-align:left;" | No MEPs
| style="text-align:right;" | 43
| style="text-align:right;" | 54,942
| style="text-align:right;" | 0
| style="text-align:right;" |  0
| style="text-align:right;" | 0%
| style="text-align:right;" | 0.61%
|-
| 
| style="text-align:left;" | Prodemo Party()
| style="text-align:left;" | —
| style="text-align:left;" | No MEPs
| style="text-align:right;" | 26
| style="text-align:right;" | 53,351
| style="text-align:right;" | 0
| style="text-align:right;" |  0
| style="text-align:right;" | 0%
| style="text-align:right;" | 0.59%
|-
| style="background-color:|
| style="text-align:left;" | United Romania Party()
| style="text-align:left;" | —
| style="text-align:left;" | No MEPs
| style="text-align:right;" | 30
| style="text-align:right;" | 51,787
| style="text-align:right;" | 0
| style="text-align:right;" |  0
| style="text-align:right;" | 0%
| style="text-align:right;" | 0.57%
|-
| style="background-color:red|
| style="text-align:left;" | Romanian Socialist Party()
| style="text-align:left;" | —
| style="text-align:left;" | No MEPs
| style="text-align:right;" | 28
| style="text-align:right;" | 40,135
| style="text-align:right;" | 0
| style="text-align:right;" |  0
| style="text-align:right;" | 0%
| style="text-align:right;" | 0.44%
|-
| style="background-color:red|
| style="text-align:left;" | Independent Social Democratic Party()
| style="text-align:left;" | —
| style="text-align:left;" | No MEPs
| style="text-align:right;" | 43
| style="text-align:right;" | 26,439
| style="text-align:right;" | 0
| style="text-align:right;" |  0
| style="text-align:right;" | 0%
| style="text-align:right;" | 0.29%
|-
| 
| style="text-align:left;" | National Unity Block - NUB()
| style="text-align:left;" | —
| style="text-align:left;" | No MEPs
| style="text-align:right;" | 12
| style="text-align:right;" | 20,411
| style="text-align:right;" | 0
| style="text-align:right;" |  0
| style="text-align:right;" | 0%
| style="text-align:right;" | 0.23%
|-
| style="text-align:left;" colspan=4 |Total: 18,267,256 expected voters (turnout – 51.20%)
! style="text-align:right;" | 483
! style="text-align:right;" | 9,352,472
! style="text-align:right;" | 33
! style="text-align:right;" |  1
! style="text-align:right;" | 100%
! style="text-align:right;" | 100%
|-
| style="text-align:left;" colspan=11 |Source: Summary of the results
|}

Notes
 After the 2014 election, PNL merged with PD-L/PDL and joined the EPP, and EPP Group.
 Prior to the 2019 election, Save Romania Union had no MEPs, and no European affiliation.
 According to the website of the ALDE Group, USR Plus will be part of its new group called "ALDE plus Renaissance plus USR Plus.
 Monica Macovei, the founder of the M10 party, was ousted.
 Daciana Sârbu sits with the S&D.
 Laurențiu Rebega sits with the ECR.
 After the lists have been approved by the Central Electoral Bureau, three candidates of the 2020 USR-PLUS Alliance have renounced their candidacy. The Central Electoral Bureau ruled the elimination of said positions on the list.

Legislative 

The Social Democratic Party (PSD) won the general election with a little bit over 29% of the seats in both houses of Parliament, but remained in opposition. PNL, USR-PLUS, and UDMR forming a coalition government.

This election saw the return of the county (and Bucharest) level lists, replacing the previous mixed member election. In addition, it also maintained special seats for Romanians living abroad (i.e. the Romanian diaspora), in both houses.

Local 

|-
|- style="background-color:#C9C9C9"
! style="background-color:#E9E9E9;text-align:center;" colspan=2 rowspan=2 | Party
! style="background-color:#E9E9E9;text-align:center;" colspan=3 | Mayor of Bucharest (PGMB)
! style="background-color:#E9E9E9;text-align:center;" colspan=3 | Mayors (P)
! style="background-color:#E9E9E9;text-align:center;" colspan=3 | Local Councilsseats (CL)
! style="background-color:#E9E9E9;text-align:center;" colspan=3 | County Councilsseats (CJ)
|-
|- style="background-color:#C9C9C9"
! style="background-color:#E9E9E9;text-align:center;" |Votes
! style="background-color:#E9E9E9;text-align:center;" |%
! style="background-color:#E9E9E9;text-align:center;" |Seats
! style="background-color:#E9E9E9;text-align:center;" |Votes
! style="background-color:#E9E9E9;text-align:center;" |%
! style="background-color:#E9E9E9;text-align:center;" |Seats
! style="background-color:#E9E9E9;text-align:center;" |Votes
! style="background-color:#E9E9E9;text-align:center;" |%
! style="background-color:#E9E9E9;text-align:center;" |Seats
! style="background-color:#E9E9E9;text-align:center;" |Votes
! style="background-color:#E9E9E9;text-align:center;" |%
! style="background-color:#E9E9E9;text-align:center;" |Seats
|-
| 
| style="text-align:left;" | National Liberal Party ( - PNL)
| style="text-align:right;" |282,631
(with USR-PLUS)
| style="text-align:right;" |42.81%
(with USR-PLUS)
| style="text-align:right;" |1
| style="text-align:right;" |2,578,820
| style="text-align:right;" |34.58%
| style="text-align:right;" |1,232
| style="text-align:right;" |2,420,413
| style="text-align:right;" |32.88%
| style="text-align:right;" |14,182
| style="text-align:right;" |2,212,904
| style="text-align:right;" |30.76%
| style="text-align:right;" |474
|-
| 
| style="text-align:left;" | Social Democratic Party ( - PSD)
| style="text-align:right;" |250,690
| style="text-align:right;" |37.97%
| style="text-align:right;" |0
| style="text-align:right;" |2,262,791
| style="text-align:right;" |30.34%
| style="text-align:right;" |1,362
| style="text-align:right;" |2,090,777
| style="text-align:right;" |28.40%
| style="text-align:right;" |13,820
| style="text-align:right;" |1,605,721
| style="text-align:right;" |22.32%
| style="text-align:right;" |362
|-
| style="background-color:#00aae7 "|
| style="text-align:left;" | USR-PLUS ( - USR-PLUS)
| style="text-align:right;" |282,631
(with PNL)
| style="text-align:right;" |42.81%
(with PNL)
| style="text-align:right;" |1
| style="text-align:right;" |490,362
| style="text-align:right;" |6.58%
| style="text-align:right;" |28
| style="text-align:right;" |504,563
| style="text-align:right;" |6.85%
| style="text-align:right;" |1,207
| style="text-align:right;" |478,659
| style="text-align:right;" |6.65%
| style="text-align:right;" |65
|-
| 
| style="text-align:left;" | People's Movement Party  ( - PMP)
| style="text-align:right;" |72,556
| style="text-align:right;" |10.99%
| style="text-align:right;" |0
| style="text-align:right;" |353,005
| style="text-align:right;" |4.73%
| style="text-align:right;" |50
| style="text-align:right;" |420,791
| style="text-align:right;" |5.72%
| style="text-align:right;" |2,137
| style="text-align:right;" |423,147
| style="text-align:right;" |5.88%
| style="text-align:right;" |67
|-
| style="background-color: |
| style="text-align:left;" | PRO Romania ( - PRO RO)
| style="text-align:right;" |5,315
| style="text-align:right;" |0.80%
| style="text-align:right;" |0
| style="text-align:right;" |331,878
| style="text-align:right;" |4.45%
| style="text-align:right;" |36
| style="text-align:right;" |381,535
| style="text-align:right;" |5.18%
| style="text-align:right;" |1,885
| style="text-align:right;" |356,030
| style="text-align:right;" |4.95%
| style="text-align:right;" |56
|-
| 
| style="text-align:left;" | Democratic Alliance of Hungarians in Romania  ( - UDMR)
| style="text-align:right;" |-
| style="text-align:right;" |-
| style="text-align:right;" |-
| style="text-align:right;" |299,334
| style="text-align:right;" |4.01%
| style="text-align:right;" |199
| style="text-align:right;" |362,442
| style="text-align:right;" |4.92%
| style="text-align:right;" |2,360
| style="text-align:right;" |379,924
| style="text-align:right;" |5.28%
| style="text-align:right;" |92
|-
| 
| style="text-align:left;" | Alliance of Liberals and Democrats ( - ALDE)
| style="text-align:right;" |9,892
| style="text-align:right;" |1.49%
| style="text-align:right;" |0
| style="text-align:right;" |124,649
| style="text-align:right;" |1.67%
| style="text-align:right;" |15
| style="text-align:right;" |189,665
| style="text-align:right;" |2.58%
| style="text-align:right;" |861
| style="text-align:right;" |209,411
| style="text-align:right;" |2.91%
| style="text-align:right;" |15
|-
| 
| style="text-align:left;" | Other political parties and contenders, local alliances
| style="text-align:right;" |39,034
| style="text-align:right;" |5.91%
| style="text-align:right;" |0
| style="text-align:right;" |1,140,903
| style="text-align:right;" |15.30%
| style="text-align:right;" |282
| style="text-align:right;" |1,086,907
| style="text-align:right;" |14.76%
| style="text-align:right;" |3,448
| style="text-align:right;" |1,528,189
| style="text-align:right;" |21.24%
| style="text-align:right;" |209
|-
| style="text-align:left;" colspan = 2 | Total:
| style="text-align:right;" |660,118
| style="text-align:right;" |100
| style="text-align:right;" |1
| style="text-align:right;" |7,457,093
| style="text-align:right;" |100
| style="text-align:right;" |3,176
| style="text-align:right;" |7,361,818
| style="text-align:right;" |100
| style="text-align:right;" |39,900
| style="text-align:right;" |7,193,985
| style="text-align:right;" |100
| style="text-align:right;" |1,340
|-
| style="text-align:left;" colspan=20 | Notes
|-
| style="text-align:left;" colspan=20 | Sources: Romanian Permanent Electoral Authority
|-
|}

Referendums
The Constitution of Romania defines that a referendum has to be called to:
 suspend the President from office (article 95), or
 amend the Constitution (article 151)
Moreover, the Constitution defines that a referendum can be called on matters of national interest by the President of Romania after consultation with Parliament (article 90).

There were 8 referendums (and 1 local one) in post-communist Romania:
 2 constitutional referendums: in 1991 and 2003
 2 presidential impeachment referendums: in May 2007 and in 2012
 voting system referendum in November 2007
 parliamentary reform referendum in 2009
 referendum regarding the definition of family and another one only in the Olt County to rename it to "Olt-Romanați County" in 2018 at the same time
 referendum about justice and corruption in 2019

There was also 1 referendum in the Socialist Republic of Romania, 3 referendums in the Kingdom of Romania and 2 referendums in the Romanian United Principalities.

See also
 Electoral calendar
 Electoral system

References

Sources
 Official site of the Chamber of Deputies of Romania

External links
Report on 30 November 2008 election results
Adam Carr's Election Archive
Parties and elections
Report on new Uninominal System